Carlos Fernández Luna (born 22 May 1996) is a Spanish professional footballer who plays as a forward for Real Sociedad.

Club career

Sevilla
Born in Castilleja de Guzmán, Province of Seville, Andalusia, Fernández started playing senior football with Sevilla FC's reserve team at only 17, competing in Segunda División B. On 18 December 2013, he made his official debut with the main squad, coming on as a substitute for Piotr Trochowski in a 0–2 home loss against Racing de Santander in the round of 32 of the Copa del Rey.

On 2 March 2014, still before his 18th birthday, Fernández first appeared in La Liga, replacing fellow youth graduate José Antonio Reyes midway through the second half of an eventual 1–0 victory over Real Sociedad also at the Ramón Sánchez Pizjuán Stadium. He scored a career-best 17 goals for the B side during the 2015–16 campaign, helping in their promotion to Segunda División.

Fernández scored his first professional goal on 21 August 2016, in the reserves' 3–3 home draw with Girona FC. Three weeks later, he netted for the first time in the top flight with the first team, scoring the second of two late goals in a 2–1 home defeat of UD Las Palmas.

During a training session in early October 2016, Fernández partially ruptured the anterior cruciate ligament to his left knee, going on to miss the rest of the season. He returned to training the following April, and continued to appear mostly for the reserves.

On 30 August 2018, Fernández was loaned to second-division club Deportivo de La Coruña for one year. On 14 August of the following year, he moved to Granada CF of the top tier also in a temporary deal, scoring ten goals to help them to finish seventh and qualify for the UEFA Europa League for the first time in their history.

Real Sociedad
On 24 January 2021, after being deemed surplus to requirements by manager Julen Lopetegui, Fernández signed a -year contract with Real Sociedad, with his former club receiving a transfer fee of a reported €10 million plus another two in variables. He scored his first goal on 18 April, opening an eventual 1–2 home loss to precisely Sevilla.

Fernández missed the entire 2021–22 season, due to another serious knee injury.

Career statistics

Honours
Real Sociedad
Copa del Rey: 2019–20

Spain U19
UEFA European Under-19 Championship: 2015

References

External links
Sevilla official profile

1996 births
Living people
People from Aljarafe
Sportspeople from the Province of Seville
Spanish footballers
Footballers from Andalusia
Association football forwards
La Liga players
Segunda División players
Segunda División B players
Sevilla Atlético players
Sevilla FC players
Deportivo de La Coruña players
Granada CF footballers
Real Sociedad footballers
Spain youth international footballers
Spain under-21 international footballers